Dave White (born 1971) is a contemporary British artist, and has exhibited his work internationally whilst working with various with clients for Nike, AOL, and Air Jordan.

Background and career
Touted as the UK's "Andy Warhol", he has worked on various subject matters inspired by popular culture.

While enrolled in Liverpool John Moores University in 1991 to study Fine Art, White painted in John Lennon's old art studio. After graduating in 1994, White exhibited in the Northern Graduates Exhibition at the Royal College of Art in London. White's work was represented by Anthony Brown of the art gallery Connaught Brown through a five-year artist/gallery relationship and exhibited at art fairs and galleries all over the world. White is currently represented by GUSFORD.

Early works
Since 2002, White's work has been celebrated for his dedication to a sneaker series, pioneering the movement known as 'sneaker art' which has resulted in international exhibitions and appearances. Companies such as Nike own a series of his work in their corporate collections and continue to collaborate with him. His collection has been exhibited globally, ranging from the People's Square Exhibition Hall in Shanghai to the Atlanta Contemporary Art Centre in the USA.

In 2007, White was commissioned by Coca-Cola to create a painting of Jay Z's new design for Cherry Coke. White's work was exhibited at the Dia Arts Centre in New York and is now displayed at Coca-Cola Headquarters in Atlanta, USA. 2007 also brought White's debut solo exhibition during Art Basel Miami titled The Good, The Bad and The Ugly, featuring large scale superhero portraits.

In 2008, White held his debut solo exhibition of his vintage military inspired pop art portraits in a show entitled Planes, Tanks and Automatics at the Truman Brewery during Frieze week. His work was featured in the Wall Street Journal and "sold briskly" in spite of economic turmoil. Stephen Adams of The Daily Telegraph described him as "one of Britain's most feted up and coming painters".

Later works and collaborations
In 2010 White exhibited at the New Museum of Contemporary Art in New York on the 'Project on Creativity' with Chuck Close, celebrating Aol's 25th Anniversary. White was also invited to create a live installation at All Things Digital in Los Angeles. Later in the year he was also commissioned to create his largest work 'Rodeo Rider', measuring 11 ft x 8 ft for Aol's New York headquarters.

In 2011, White collaborated with Air Jordan in Los Angeles for their corporate responsibility program 'WINGS for the Future', designing 23 pairs of bespoke All Star sneakers which were auctioned for charity, raising $23,000.

White's collection of work Americana exhibited in London and Copenhagen in 2011 and was featured on BBC Radio 2's The Arts Show, as well as in international press. In 2014, White had his first solo exhibition at GUSFORD, debuting the Apex series featuring great white sharks. In 2016, White collaborated with Nike to release two colorways of the Nike Air Max 95, inspired by Britain's native wildlife.

Select group exhibitions
2015	Summer Show, Joseph Gross Gallery, New York
2015	Dog Days, Hang Up Gallery, London
2015	Mix, Lawrence Alkin Gallery
2015	Art 15 with Jealous Gallery
2015	London Original Print Fair with Jealous Gallery
2015	Loughran Gallery, Edinburgh, Scotland
2015	Jealous Take Over at The Cock n' Bull Gallery (Tramshed), London
2014	This is Jealous, Jealous Gallery, London
2014	Hang Up Collections - Volume I, Hang Up Gallery, London
2014	Mix, Lawrence Alkin Gallery, London
2014	Sprung Loughran Gallery, London
2013	Loughran Gallery Shoreditch London
2012	RE:DEFINE Goss-Michael Foundation, Dallas, USA curated by The Future Tense 
2012	BT Art Box Trafalgar Square, London
2012	CNNCTD+100 New Museum of Contemporary Art, New York
2011	Dunkeys Evolve with Coolrain, Imazoo Gallery, Seoul, Korea
2011	Mixed Up', Galerie Jules Julian, Copenhagen, Denmark
2011 15 Artists Interpret South Park, curated by Ron English, Opera Gallery, New York
2010 Forgotten Alchemy, Art Copenhagen c/o Galleri Jules Julian, Denmark
2010	Project on Creativity, New Museum of Contemporary Art, New York
2010 Art Karlruhse, Germany c/o Galerie Wild
2009 Kunst Zurich c/o Galerie Wild
2009 There's Still Life, Art London c/o Mauger Modern Art
2009 Rising Stars, Seoul Art Museum, Korea
2009	EISZEIT, Galerie Wild Zurich
2008	Amerikanische Kunst & Pop Art, Galerie Wild Frankfurt; travelled to Galerie Wild Zurich
2008	Be True, Pop Art Gallery, Seoul
2007	Unveiling Cherry Coke, Dia Arts Centre, New York (curated by The Strategic Group)
2007	My Kimono, Tomofuko Gallery, Tokyo
2007	Lucky Cat, Source Gallery, Shanghai
2006	Sneaker Pimps, Atlanta Contemporary Art Center, Atlanta
2005	Jordan XXI, People's Square Urban Exhibition Hall, Shanghai
2005	Rayguns, White Gallery, Beijing
2005	Your Shoes, Refill Gallery, Sydney
2004	Fresh Still Life, Centrum Beeldende Kunst, Rotterdam (curated by Wink Van Kempen)
2003	In the Summertime, Galerie Wild, Frankfurt
2001	Crows Having Fun, Raw Gallery, London 
1998	Chicago Art Fair, c/o Connaught Brown, London
1997	Group Show, Connaught Brown, London
1996	Paris Art Fair, c/o Connaught Brown, London
1997 Animals in Art, Harris Museum & Art Gallery, Preston (hosted by Earl & Countess of Derby, curated by Dr Lindsay Stainton); travelled to Royal Pavilion, Brighton; and Sotheby's London (hosted by Lord Hartington)
1994	Northern Graduates, Royal College of Art, London

Select press
Ibyen (Denmark)
Art Daily
Art Observed
El Pais
Bloomberg Press
Art Info

References

External links
 Dave White (requires Flash)

1971 births
Living people
20th-century English painters
21st-century English painters
Artists from Liverpool
English male painters
British pop artists
Alumni of Liverpool John Moores University
20th-century English male artists
21st-century English male artists